David Nga Kor Ming (born 11 November 1972) is a Malaysian politician who has served as the Minister of Local Government Development in the Pakatan Harapan (PH) administration under Prime Minister Anwar Ibrahim since December 2022. He served as Deputy Speaker of the Dewan Rakyat under former Speaker Mohamad Ariff Md Yusof from July 2018 to his resignation in July 2020. He was also a member of the Perak State Executive Council (EXCO) in the Pakatan Rakyat (PR) state administration under former Menteri Besar Mohammad Nizar Jamaluddin from March 2008 to the collapse of the administration in February 2009. He has also served as the Member of Parliament for Teluk Intan since May 2018 and for Taiping from March 2008 to May 2018. He has been a Member of the Perak State Legislative Assembly for Kepayang from May 2013 to May 2018, and again since November 2022, for Aulong from May 2018 to November 2022, and for Pantai Remis from November 1999 to March 2013. He is a member of the Democratic Action Party (DAP), a component party of the PH coalition.  He has also served as National Vice Chairman and 3rd Parliamentary Leader of DAP since March 2022, and State Chairman of DAP of Perak. He served as Deputy Secretary-General of DAP from November 2017 to March 2022.

Personal life
Nga Kor Ming was born in Kota Bharu, Kelantan, Malaysia, His family origin was of Fuzhou origin (his mother was from Kelantan) and stayed at Ayer Tawar when they came to Malaya. He and his family are Methodists and he was christened to David by the late Rev. Koh Gie Bing. His wife is also from Ayer Tawar; they have three children.

Education and professional career
Nga Kor Ming received a Bachelor of Laws from Universiti Malaya. Before his appointment to the Perak executive council, he practised as a lawyer in Ayer Tawar and also in Ipoh, Perak.

In 2007, he was recognised as one of Ten Outstanding Young Malaysians by the International Junior Chamber of Commerce and the Ministry of Youth and Sports in the category of 'Politics and Government'. This award was notable as it rarely goes to opposition politicians.

Political career
Nga made his election debut and had been Perak State Assemblyman for Pantai Remis for three terms since the 1999, 2004 and 2008 General Elections. He became Member of Parliament for Taiping, Perak after defeating President of the People's Progressive Party (PPP), M. Kayveas with a majority of 11,298 votes in the 2008 General Election too on 8 March 2008. In 2008, with the formation of the Perak government by the coalition of DAP, PKR and PAS (known as Pakatan Rakyat) (PR), Nga was appointed to the state executive committee, with the portfolios of Education, Local Government, Housing and Public Transport. Perak had previously been ruled continuously by the Barisan Nasional (BN) (or its predecessor the Alliance) since the independence of Malaya (later Malaysia) in 1957. In the 2013 General Election, he was reelected in the Taiping parliamentary seat and won the Perak state seat of Kepayang too. In the 2018 General Election, he won the Parliament for the seat of Teluk Intan by defeating the incumbent, Mah Siew Keong of BN and the Perak state seat of Aulong concurrently.

Controversies and issues

Racial Remarks
In 2011, Nga Kor Ming used the term "metallic black" to describe Menteri Besar of Perak Zambry Abdul Kadir, during political rallies in Kamunting. Nga Kor Ming apologised for his Anti-Indian racist remarks for calling Zambry a "metallic black person". It was obvious that he was referring to Dr Zambry's skin colour of the Indians when he uttered the phrase in various speeches as seen in YouTube, which he subsequently denied.

The apology was accepted by DAP national chairman Karpal Singh, however, it is believed that no disciplinary action was taken although DAP was known as a multi-racial party and its leaders were not known to pass racist remarks against any community or race until the racial slur by Nga Kor Ming.

Tailorgate
In 2012, Nga Kor Ming sued blogger sekupangdua, whose true identity is Ahmad Sofian Yahya at Ipoh High Court for exemplary damages, aggravated damages and an order of injunction against further publication of defamatory words.

It has been revealed that his wife's company was previously awarded the contract to make lounge suits for the councillors of Ipoh City Council (MBI) when Pakatan Rakyat (PR) was ruling Perak.

DAP Perak stresses that MBI's award of tailoring contract was done by the council's tender board by way of open tender, it is claimed that Nga did not interfere in the committee overlooking the open tender process. The subject matter is a contract for 24 lounge suit for MBI councillors at the price of RM650 each and a total price of RM14,400.00.

Nga's wife's company, which submitted a bid for RM650 per suit, predictably ended up being awarded the job sometime in 2008. The open tender involved 4 other tailor companies and Nga's wife's company Ethan and Elton was awarded the contract despite being the most expensive at RM650, the lowest bidder Goodman Tailor having tendered for RM450.

The DAP disciplinary committee cleared Nga of any power abuse in the awarding of a lounge suit contract to his wife's company.

Speech controversy
In May 2018, Nga Kor Ming’s action of ridiculing Mahathir Mohamad by touching on the issue of his mortality, has been deemed rude, uncouth, extreme and disgusting, and runs contrary to the customs and norms of the people of Malaysia.

School's building named after him
In 2019, the naming of a new three-storey building of SJK (C) Sin Min, a Chinese primary school in Simpang, Perak, after Nga has raised a controversy. The 3D Chinese characters for 'Nga Kor Ming Building' affixed on the new block to honour Nga for helping to secure a RM220,000 government grant for the school, was questioned and condemned by certain quarters. Nga dismissed criticism over the polemic and pointed it was the school board's decision to pick his name and he did not make a request nor give instruction for the school to do so.

Criticism on Malaysian Labor in Singapore
On 27 October 2022 in Johor, Nga Kor Ming sparked another controversy in which he publicly claimed that Malaysians would be forced to wake up so early to work in Singapore and come home late at night if Barisan Nasional wins the election. He further stated that if Pakatan Harapan wins the general election, Singaporeans will flock to Malaysia as foreign labourers not the other way round.  

Following that statement, he had clarification that he did not wish to offend anyone with his remarks and he claimed that the opposition had taken his comments out of context and he meant that Malaysia should maintain a mutually beneficial relationship with Singapore.

Election results

References

Living people
1972 births
People from Perak
Malaysian Methodists
20th-century Malaysian lawyers
Malaysian politicians of Chinese descent
Democratic Action Party (Malaysia) politicians
Members of the Dewan Rakyat
Members of the Perak State Legislative Assembly
Perak state executive councillors
University of Malaya alumni
21st-century Malaysian politicians
21st-century Malaysian lawyers
Malaysian Christians